"I Love My Radio (Midnight Radio)" is a song by Italo disco singer Taffy, first released as a single in 1985. It was produced by Italian record producer Claudio Cecchetto. The song was a top ten hit in Italy and the United Kingdom, and was also a hit in several countries in Europe. In the United Kingdom, the single was released in 1986 and peaked at No. 6 on the UK Singles Chart in early 1987.

The song is about a radio disc jockey broadcasting in the early hours. However, as none of the BBC Radio stations broadcast after midnight in the 1980s (only a few commercial stations did), this reference in the record was changed, and the UK version was re-recorded and retitled as "I Love My Radio (Dee Jay's Radio)", with a few changes in lyrics; the lyric "DJ after midnight" was changed to "DJ up to midnight" and "on the midnight radio" was changed to "on the good time radio".

Charts

References 

1985 songs
1985 singles
1986 singles
Songs written by Claudio Cecchetto
Songs about radio
Italo disco songs